The 2013–14 CEV Cup was the 42nd edition of the European CEV Cup volleyball club tournament.

French club Paris Volley beat Russian Guberniya Nizhniy Novgorod after winning second match and Golden Set. Serbian outside hitter Marko Ivovic was honored as the Most Valuable Player of the final tournament.

Participating teams

Main phase

16th Finals

|}

8th Finals

|}

4th Finals

|}

First leg

|}

Second leg

|}

Challenge phase

|}

First leg 

|}

Second leg 

|}

Final phase

Semi finals

|}

First leg

|}

Second leg

|}

Final

First leg

|}

Second leg

|}

Final standing

References

External links
 Official site

CEV Cup
2013 in volleyball
2014 in volleyball